Circle is an American digital multicast television network owned by Circle Media, LLC, a joint venture of Gray Television and Ryman Hospitality Properties subsidiary Opry Entertainment Group. The network's programming consists of country music oriented shows, and rural/blue collar themed material, featuring a mix of original and off-network shows.

The network is available primarily through the digital subchannels of broadcast television stations, as well as an ad-supported video-on-demand channel on Peacock and Stirr, along with national carriage on Dish Network and Sling TV. Cable television and IPTV providers may offer either the network's local affiliate, or the network's national feed on their systems.

Circle Media is headquartered in Nashville, Tennessee, with offices at Ryman's E.W. Wendell Building and production facilities inside the Grand Ole Opry House. The network's flagship station is Gray's WSMV-DT5, a station which had been owned by a forerunner company of RHP until its sale in 1981 and separation from WSM and WSM-FM (Gray acquired the station from Meredith Corporation in 2021). The network is master controlled out of Gray's Atlanta hub.

Background
Circle is Ryman Hospitality Properties' fourth entry into television network ownership. From its founding in 1983 until 1997, the company—known then as the Gaylord Entertainment Company—was owner of The Nashville Network (TNN). Gaylord later bought a second country music-oriented cable network, Country Music Television (CMT), in 1991. Gaylord Entertainment sold both networks to the CBS Cable unit of CBS Corporation in 1997 for $1.55 billion feeling that the two then-country networks could grow faster as part of a larger media company. Gaylord, however, retained CMT International. Gaylord Cable Networks took its stakes in TV Argentina and CMT International to launch the MusicCountry channel in Mexico and Argentine in 2000. Then on September 1, 2000, the company launched the MusicCountry service in Europe. Gaylord would subsequently rebrand CMT channels in Australia, Brazil, Indonesia, the Philippines, and Asia-Pacific region's areas to the MusicCountry brand.

History
Towards the end of the 2010s, Ryman Hospitality Properties was looking to venture back into television, with its Opry Entertainment unit already having co-produced the dramatic series Nashville, along with the end of its partnerships to carry the Opry with CMT, then Great American Country, as their managements both shifted away from music programming and towards a more generic and broad-based focus on Southern culture.  In 2018, Ryman had settled on a broadcast television network and began pursuing starting one as they felt country music fans are underserved.  Ryman tested nine potential shows via a sizzle reel with excellent responses from focus group sessions.

Ryman and Gray Television announced a joint venture between Gray and Ryman's subsidiary, Opry Entertainment Group on April 24, 2019 to launch a broadcast television network in early 2020 and an online streaming service later.  The planned network would feature the Grand Ole Opry archives and performances from the Grand Ole Opry House and other Ryman-owned music venues. On October 17, 2019, the joint venture partners would confirm that Gray-owned stations would be among the network's charter affiliates; they would also reveal on that date the network's name — Circle, which is a nod to the iconic 6-foot wooden section of stage at the Opry House (and that section's original home, Ryman Auditorium) on which various country stars have performed.

On December 16, 2019, Circle's formal launch date of January 1, 2020 was announced for Circle, along with a roster of 16 new programs for the network. Additionally, CBS Television Stations was also announced as joining in Circle's list of charter affiliates, bringing major markets to the network's initial list of stations to 56 affiliates covering 50% of the country.  As of October 2020, Circle has 99 affiliates reaching 62.61% of U.S. TV households.

Programming
Circle currently provides up to 20 hours of programming to its owned-and-operated and affiliated stations on weekdays from 7:00 a.m. to 3:00 a.m. Eastern Time and on weekends from 11:00 a.m. to 3:00 a.m. Eastern Time. The remaining vacated hours are occupied by paid programming.

Circle features programming geared toward both fans of the country music genre and rural audiences, a similar demographic targeted by competing country music-oriented multicast networks Heartland (which, incidentally from 2012 until 2013, used The Nashville Network moniker once used by Ryman's original cable network venture) and The Country Network. Circle's programming primarily features a mix of original and acquired series with a country music or Southern lifestyle-centric format.

Circle currently broadcasts two simultaneous feeds: one for digital distribution, and the other for terrestrial distribution. The terrestrial feed (which typically appears as a digital subchannel of a major network affiliate station in numerous markets around the United States) airs classic movies and off-network syndicated programming, while the digital feed (distributed over streaming services such as Peacock and Roku) features more company-owned music-based programming. Those feeds converge for live programming, such as the daily simulcast of WSM Radio morning show "Coffee, Country & Cody" and Grand Ole Opry broadcasts, as well as during regular timeslots of Circle-produced original programming.

As the network was under development, Circle Media developed several original productions for the network's inaugural programming slate—aiming to make it one of a handful of digital multicast services that carry original programming, and one of the few (alongside the Live Well Network, which reduced its national distribution outside of sister networks ABC's owned-and-operated stations in January 2015, and its rebrand Localish) to offer a large original content slate. On December 11, 2019, Circle Media announced that it had greenlit 16 original programs slated to debut on the network in Circle's first five months of operation, including a simulcast of WSM Radio's Coffee, Country & Cody (which had previously aired on competing country music-oriented multicast network Heartland), and the music and interview series The Dailey and Vincent Show which moved from the show's prior four-year home, RFD-TV. and several docu-series (including Craig's World, a reality program centering on country artist Craig Morgan; Fandom, focusing on the artist-fan relationship in country music; Upstream, a fishing/interview program hosted by Elizabeth Cook; and several Grand Ole Opry-focused series such as Opry Debut).

To help stations comply with FCC regulations, Circle airs E/I programming on late Sunday mornings, with programming sourced from Storrs Media/Telco Productions.

Among the initial offerings were all surviving episodes of Hee Haw.

Current programming

Original programming

Music/interview programming
 Backstage at the Opry (January 1, 2020–present) – Docu-series following artists preparing for performances at the Grand Ole Opry.
 Bluebird Café Sessions (February 2020–present) – Music series featuring performances from popular and up-and-coming country artists, recorded at the iconic Bluebird Café in Nashville.
 Coffee, Country & Cody (January 1, 2020–present) – Three-hour television simulcast of the WSM Radio morning program; hosted by Bill Cody with co-host Charlie Mattos and entertainment correspondent Kelly Sutton. The show is produced by occasional co-host Eric Marcum and is broadcast live from WSM Radio's studio inside the Gaylord Opryland Resort & Convention Center.
 The Dailey & Vincent Show (January 1, 2020–present) – Music series hosted by the bluegrass/country/gospel duo of Jamie Dailey and Darrin Vincent featuring solo and collaborative performances with popular country music artists.
 Fandom (February 2020) – Docu-series exploring the relationship between country artists and their fans from each's perspective.
 Opry Live (February 2020–present)—One hour of an episode of the Grand Ole Opry; initially aired live in simulcast with the WSM radio broadcast, since 2021, Opry Live has typically been a pre-recorded live to tape hour of a Tuesday or Friday Opry radio broadcast or previously televised live Saturday broadcast, allowing WSM to continue carrying less demographic-friendly acts, square dances and audience-participation bits.
 My Opry Debut (January 1, 2020–present) – Docu-series chronicling up-and-coming country artists making their debut performance at the Grand Ole Opry.
 Opry Anniversary (January 1, 2020–present) – Docu-series chronicling country artists looking back at their debut performance at the Grand Ole Opry.
 Austin City Limits: Country (June 8-August 17, 2022) - Hosted by singer-songwriter Rodney Crowell, featuring classic Austin City Limits episodes with a country flavor, along with behind-the-scenes, and never-before-seen interviews.
 Opry Docs (January 1, 2020–present) – Docu-series hosted by contemporary artists chronicling the life and careers of legendary country musicians.
 Phil Vassar’s Songs from the Cellar (January 2, 2020–present) – Music and interview series hosted by Phil Vassar, featuring interviews with artists, songwriters, entertainers, athletes and wine enthusiasts at his personal wine cellar.
 The Write Stuff (January 7, 2020–present) – Docu-series chronicling the composition steps of country music's greatest songs.

Lifestyle/entertainment programming
 Authentic America (January 2, 2020–present) – Hosted by veteran television host Nan Kelley and country artist Charlie Kelley, in which the married couple spotlight lesser-known attractions and eateries, and interesting people around the U.S.
 Bellamy Brothers' Honky Tonk Ranch (January 1, 2020–present) – Reality series chronicling country duo David and Howard Bellamy's music career, and home and ranch life.
 Better Half (January 2, 2020–present) – Reality docu-series chronicling the lives of the spouses of country and NASCAR stars.
 Craig's World (February 2020–present) – Docu-series featuring Craig Morgan dealing with the music world, his businesses and his family.
 Family Traditions (February 2020–present) – Docu-series profiling the descendants of legendary country music artists.
 Southern Weekend (January 2, 2020–present) – Travel series highlighting attractions of note across the Southern U.S.; hosted by Natalie Stovall.
 Stand Up Nashville! (January 3, 2020–present) – Stand-up comedy showcase recorded at Zanies Comedy Club in downtown Nashville.
 Upstream (May 2020 – present) – A fishing program featuring host Elizabeth Cook conducting conversations with country artists at various fishing locations.

Affiliates
, Circle has current or pending affiliation agreements with 96 television stations in 96 media markets encompassing 39 states, covering 62.60% (or a total population of 195,620,130 residents) of all households in the United States that own at least one television set. It is also carried as a live channel on NBC's streaming service Peacock, and on Vizio's Free Streaming Channels platform on their current generation of smart TVs.

Before its launch, Circle Media actively sought affiliation agreements with various television station owners to make the Circle network widely available throughout the United States. The network launched with clearance rate of, at minimum, 50% of overall American television households, in part due to affiliation agreements with stations owned by network co-parent Gray Television (initially encompassing 56 of the group's stations, with no clearance in approximately 15 other small-sized markets with a Gray-owned station) and CBS Television Stations, which provided Circle broad clearance in the 25 largest U.S. markets (including New York City, Los Angeles, Philadelphia, San Francisco, Boston, Miami–Fort Lauderdale and Dallas–Fort Worth) through the group's CW O&Os and independent stations.

Ironically at the network's launch, Circle was not available over-the-air in the network's headquarters of Nashville, despite its status as the hub of the country music industry. Gray Television did not own any television stations in the Nashville television market (the company was only in two of the six Tennessee-based television markets) until 2021, and did not secure a local affiliate prior the network's debut. The network gained an affiliate in that market on January 31, 2020, via the DT5 subchannel of (at the time) Meredith Local Media-owned NBC affiliate WSMV-TV, which was formerly owned alongside Ryman's Opry properties from 1950 until 1981 and had a short-lived launch affiliation with Heartland, which launched utilizing the trademark of The Nashville Network. but lost it a year later due to business disputes. On May 3, 2021, Gray announced it was purchasing Meredith's broadcasting properties (and the sale was completed on December 1), which made WSMV-TV both an O&O station for the network as well as its flagship station.

In a few markets, the network is not available at all due to a lack of room to offer the network in full, but local stations such as Milwaukee's WVTV-DT2 carry the Opry telecast on a tape delay direct from Circle and air it on their primary channel as a Saturday night offering, along with The Song. Many Gray stations also carry both programs on their main channels to encourage viewership of the network.

Stations listed in BOLD are Circle owned-and-operated.

List of affiliates 
Note: Affiliate list current :

Former affiliates

References

External links
 

Television networks in the United States
Television channels and stations established in 2020
2020 establishments in the United States
Circle (TV network)
Gray Television
Grand Ole Opry
American country music
Country music mass media
Joint ventures
Companies based in Nashville, Tennessee